Meredith McGrath was the defending champion, but did not participate this year.

Nathalie Tauziat won the title, defeating Yayuk Basuki in the final 2–6, 6–2, 6–2.

Seeds
A champion seed is indicated in bold text while text in italics indicates the round in which that seed was eliminated. The top eight seeds received a bye to the second round.

  Irina Spîrlea (semifinals)
  Nathalie Tauziat (Champion)
  Lisa Raymond (quarterfinals)
  Yayuk Basuki (final)
  Anne-Gaëlle Sidot (third round)
  Dominique Van Roost (quarterfinals)
  Magdalena Maleeva (quarterfinals)
  Natasha Zvereva (quarterfinals)
  Linda Wild (first round)
  Silvia Farina (first round)
  Els Callens (second round)
  Alexandra Fusai (second round)
  Tamarine Tanasugarn (second round)
  Miriam Oremans (third round)
  Sarah Pitkowski (first round)
  Larisa Neiland (second round)

Qualifying

Draw

Finals

Top half

Section 1

Section 2

Bottom half

Section 3

Section 4

References
 1997 DFS Classic Draws
 ITF Tournament Page
 ITF singles results page

Singles
DFS Classic - Singles